Film New Europe may refer to one of two unrelated film organizations based in Warsaw, Poland
 Film New Europe Association, a networking body and information website
 New Europe Film Sales, a production company and distributor